Louis Samain (July 4, 1834 – October 24, 1901) was a Belgian sculptor.
Samain was born in Nivelles, and studied at the Académie Royale des Beaux-Arts in Brussels under Louis Simonis. After winning the Belgian Prix de Rome, he lived for a time in Italy. In 1889, he was awarded a gold medal at the Paris Exposition Universelle, and in 1895 his work was shown at the Société des Artistes Français in Paris. He died in Ixelles.

Selected works 
 Architecture, on the facade of the Royal Museums of Fine Arts of Belgium
 Earth and Water, at les Halles centrales (destroyed in 1956)
 Italian Arts and Spanish Arts, in the garden of the Musée des Beaux-Arts
 Jean van Ruysbroeck
 Monument to Work, formerly on the old Gare de Bruxelles-Midi
 Nègres marrons surpris par des chiens (also known as Esclave repris par les chiens)
 Thémis, on the Palais de Justice in Dinant
 Tinctoris in Nivelles

References 
 Obituary
 Oxford Index
 Public sculptures in Belgium (French)
 Samain's works in the Royal Museums of Fine Arts of Belgium

Belgian sculptors
1834 births
1901 deaths